The 19225 / 19226 Jodhpur–Jammu Tawi Express is an Express train belonging to the Indian Railways that run between  and  in India.

Service 
It operates as train number 19225 from Jodhpur Junction to Jammu Tawi and as train number 19226 in the reverse direction, serving the state of Punjab and the union territory of Jammu and Kashmir.

Coaches

The service presently has one AC 2 Tier, two AC 3 Tier, ten Sleeper class & three General Unreserved coaches.

As with most train services in India, coach composition may be amended at the discretion of Indian Railways depending on demand.

Routeing

Traction
As this route is partially electrified, a Ludhiana-based WDM-3A pulls the train up to its destination.

See also
 Bathinda–Jammu Tawi Express (via Rajpura)

References

External links
19225 Bathinda–Jammu Tawi Express at India Rail Info
19226 Jammu Tawi–Bathinda Express at India Rail Info

Transport in Jammu
Transport in Bathinda
Express trains in India
Rail transport in Punjab, India
Rail transport in Jammu and Kashmir